Vincent Edward Morrissey (12 August 1925 – 25 December 2012) was an Australian rules footballer who played with Footscray in the Victorian Football League (VFL).

Notes

External links 

	

1925 births
2012 deaths
Australian rules footballers from Victoria (Australia)
Western Bulldogs players
Essendon District Football League players